Roberto Blandon (born Roberto Blandon Jolly; March 8, 1961 in Mexico City) is a  television actor in Mexico who starred in soap operas in that country in 1989, including the role of Henry in the soap opera "Mi segunda madre" producer Juan Osorio. He was among the first actors to join the broadcaster TV Azteca, then returned to Televisa. It has also been featured in theater performances and recently found in the soap opera recordings Camaleones.

Biography
He studied drama and theater in high school performance of Andres Soler in the mid 1980s. He debuted in 1989 under the cast of the telenovela Mi segunda madre playing Henry. In 1990, participating in telenovelas Cuando llega el amor and Amor de nadie of both the producer Carla Estrada, which allowed his name to be increasingly popular within the media.

In 1994 made participation in Mujer, casos de la vida real and a year later in 1995 participated in Maria La Del Barrio and José María Cano one of the antagonists of the story, the same year he participated in the telenovela Bajo un mismo rostro playing Alejandro again one of the antagonistic character at the end of the latter includes the production of Para toda la vida.

In 1996, makes a special appearance on the soap opera Canción de amor, a year later made Mi querida Isabel the villain in Oscar history, this will be his last soap opera on Televisa in the old millennium and a year later in 1998, integrates the ranks of TV Azteca in the telenovela La Chacala where he played David, one of the main characters.

In 1999 Robert made the telenovela El candidato who staged Humberto Zurita and Lorena Rojas playing Adrian Cuevas, in 2000 reunites with actress Lucía Méndez telenovela in Golpe bajo and German Santos one of the antagonists of the story. In 2001, again works with Lorena Rojas in Como en el cineas in love with the protagonist in July, this would be his last participation in TV Azteca.

In 2003, resumes his career in Televisa with an antagonistic role on the telenovela Mariana de la noche and Ivan Lugo, later featured in Mujer de madera. In 2006 he took part in the teen telenovela Código Postal as one of the main characters. In 2007, a teen telenovela done again Muchachitas como tu playing Guillermo father of one of the girls played by Gloria Sierra. The same year he made a soap telenovela / comedy Al diablo con los guapos with a temporary character in history as the father of villanita Florence, played by Ariadne Diaz.

In 2008 recorded the pilot episode of the series Mujeres Asesinas in chapter Jessica, toxica with Alejandra Barros and Odiseo Bichir that year Oscar Cardenas plays the villain in the telenovela Un gancho al corazon. In 2009 he worked in the production of Juan Osorio, Mi pecado.

Career

Filmography

Films

Television

Theatre
12 hombres en pugna
La indigación
Los 7 ahorcados
Canto verde
José el soñador
Don Quijote de la Mancha
El diluvio que viene
Galileo Galilei
La bella y la bestia
Los miserables

References

External links
 Biografía en Portal Televisa esmas.com
 Biografía en Almalatina.com - en idioma inglés

1961 births
Living people
Mexican male telenovela actors
Mexican male television actors
Mexican male stage actors
Mexican people of English descent
Male actors from Mexico City